Richard Dyer (born 24 January 1968) is a Montserratian former international footballer who played as a striker.

Career
He made his international debut for Montserrat in 2000, in a FIFA World Cup qualifying match.

References

1968 births
Living people
Montserratian footballers
Montserrat international footballers

Association football forwards